Cape MacKay is an ice-covered cape which forms the southeastern extremity of Ross Island, Antarctica. It was discovered by the British National Antarctic Expedition (1901–04) and named for Captain Harry MacKay, commander of the Terra Nova, one of the relief ships for the expedition.

References

Headlands of Ross Island